The Baracoan eyespot sphaero (Sphaerodactylus celicara) is a species of lizard in the family Sphaerodactylidae. It is endemic to Cuba.

References

Sphaerodactylus
Reptiles of Cuba
Endemic fauna of Cuba
Reptiles described in 1982
Taxa named by Albert Schwartz (zoologist)